Palais Lieben-Auspitz is a Ringstraßenpalais in Vienna, Vienna, located in the city's Innere Stadt.

Originally built for the Auspitz family in the 1872, later the Lieben family also lived there. Unlike traditional, baroque noble palaces in Vienna, the Palais Lieben-Auspitz was built in the late 19th century and is therefore called a Ringstraßenpalais. It is up to five storeys high and built in the neo-baroque style typical of its time.

The palace housed the Salon of Berta Zuckerkandl, a meeting place for intellectuals and artists. Located on the street level is the Café Landtmann.

References 

Buildings and structures in Innere Stadt
Lieben
Jews and Judaism in Vienna
Houses completed in 1872